Dilipkumar Viraji Thakor  (born 1 June 1959) is an Indian politician from the Patan District of Gujarat. He was a Minister of Labour and Employment, Disaster Management, Devsthan, and Pilgrimage Development in the Government of Gujarat under the leadership of Chief Minister Vijay Rupani. He represented the Chanasma Constituency of Patan District in the Gujarat Legislative Assembly. He contested 2022 Gujarat Legislative Assembly election from Chanasma as a BJP candidate but was defeated by his nearest rival and INC candidate Dinesh Thakor.

Footnotes

1959 births
Bharatiya Janata Party politicians from Gujarat
Gujarat MLAs 2012–2017
Gujarat MLAs 2017–2022
Living people
People from Patan district
State cabinet ministers of Gujarat